The Wardell Buffalo Trap in Sublette County, Wyoming is a small box canyon used by Native Americans for 500 years during the Late Prehistoric Period.  Nearly  of bison bones were found at the site. A campsite and butchering area is located nearby, and evidence has been found for a fence at the entrance to the canyon.

Bison were herded into the confined space of the canyon's confined space and killed, the earliest known example of such a place where bison were killed with bow and arrow. The site was first excavated in 1970-71 by Wyoming State Archeologist George Carr Frison, producing about three tons of bison bones mixed with projectile points and fragments of pottery. More excavation was undertaken in 2005 after evidence emerged of artifact poaching. Studies suggest that the hunters were Athabascans from Canada. Following excavation the site was stabilized and placed under surveillance.

References

External links
 Wardell Buffalo Trap at the Wyoming State Historic Preservation Office

Archaeological sites on the National Register of Historic Places in Wyoming
Geography of Sublette County, Wyoming
National Register of Historic Places in Sublette County, Wyoming